Foel Cwmcerwyn is the highest point of the Preseli Hills and of Pembrokeshire. It lies within the borders of the Pembrokeshire Coast National Park although it is 10 km from the sea. A path leads to the summit from the village of Rosebush in the south-west. A trig point and a number of cairns are dotted across the summit area, and there is a disused quarry on the hill's western slopes.

External links

Computer generated summit panoramas Foel Cwmcerwyn index
www.geograph.co.uk Photos of Foel Cwmcerwyn and surrounding area
Entry on Hill Bagging site
Entrry on Harold Street

Mountains and hills of Pembrokeshire
Marilyns of Wales
Highest points of Welsh counties